This is a list of awards and nominations for The Americans, an American drama television series that debuted on FX on January 30, 2013. The series stars Keri Russell, Matthew Rhys and Noah Emmerich.

The series has been nominated for a total of 86 awards, having won 26 of those nominations.

Total nominations and awards for the cast

By award

American Film Institute

Casting Society of America

Critics' Choice Television Awards

Golden Globe Awards

Peabody Award

Primetime Emmy Awards

Producers Guild of America Awards

Satellite Awards

Saturn Awards

Screen Actors Guild Awards

Television Critics Association Awards

Writers Guild of America Awards

References 

Americans, The